Hans Müller (* 17 July 1954) is a Swiss retired footballer who played for FC Basel. He played as goalkeeper.

Müller joined Basel's first team as reserve goalkeeper in 1972. After having played in just two test games, he made his domestic league debut for the club in the away game in the Olympique de la Pontaise on 26 May 1973 as Basel played a goalless draw against Lausanne-Sport. He was substituted in during the 30th minute after standard goalkeeper Jean-Paul Laufenburger had been injured. During the following season he played mainly in Basels reserve team, but advanced to become Basel's standard goalkeeper in their 1974–75 season as Jean-Paul Laufenburger and Marcel Kunz both ended their active playing days.

Between the years 1972 and 1984 Müller played a total of 226 games for Basel. Exactly 100 of these games were in the Nationalliga A, eight in the Swiss Cup, ten in the Swiss League Cup, one in the European Cup, three in the UEFA Cup, two in the UEFA Cup Winners' Cup, 20 in the Cup of the Alps and 82 were friendly games.

After his twelve seasons with Basel, Müller moved on to FC Laufen who at that time played in the Nationalliga B the second tier of Swiss football. After two years in Laufen Müller retired from active football.

Honours 
 Swiss League: 1972-73, 1976-77, 1979-80
 Swiss Cup: 1974–75

References

Sources
 Rotblau: Jahrbuch Saison 2017/2018. Publisher: FC Basel Marketing AG. 
 Die ersten 125 Jahre. Publisher: Josef Zindel im Friedrich Reinhardt Verlag, Basel. 
 Verein "Basler Fussballarchiv" Homepage

FC Basel players
FC Laufen players
Swiss men's footballers
Association football goalkeepers
1954 births
Living people
Footballers from Basel